Euphaedra fascinata is a butterfly in the family Nymphalidae. It is found in Cameroon, the Republic of the Congo, the Central African Republic and the Democratic Republic of the Congo.

References

Butterflies described in 1984
fascinata